Cousins Rock is an isolated rock located eastward of the upper part of Berry Glacier and Patton Bluff, about  northeast of Coleman Nunatak, in Marie Byrd Land. It was mapped by the United States Geological Survey from surveys and from U.S. Navy air photos, 1959–65, and named by the Advisory Committee on Antarctic Names for Michael D. Cousins, an ionospheric physicist at Siple Station, 1969–70.

References 

Rock formations of Marie Byrd Land